The 1935 U.S. Open was the 39th U.S. Open, held June 6–8 at Oakmont Country Club in Oakmont, Pennsylvania, a suburb northeast of Pittsburgh. Sam Parks Jr., a 25-year-old club pro at nearby South Hills Country Club with no prior tournament wins, prevailed by two strokes in difficult scoring conditions for his only major title. The purse was $5,000 and the winner's share was $1,000.

Jimmy Thomson owned the 36-hole lead after consecutive rounds of 73, despite severe weather that caused scores to soar. Sam Parks trailed by four, but in the third round he recorded a  chip-in for eagle to tie Thomson, who shot a 77. The weather only got worse during the final round, and Thomson could do no better than a 78. Parks, however, shot a 76 for a two-stroke victory. Walter Hagen briefly led during the final round, but four consecutive bogeys knocked him back to third. It would be the last time that Hagen would contend in a major championship. Scoring conditions were so difficult that no player in contention broke 75 and 73 was the lowest score of the round.

Parks was certainly helped by his preparation for the tournament. Every day for a month, he stopped at Oakmont to play a practice round before returning to his own club. This practice paid off particularly on Oakmont's notoriously difficult greens, where he three-putted just twice in 72 holes. His winning score of 299 was the highest since 1927, also at Oakmont, and he was the only player to break 300. Born in nearby Bellevue, Parks was an alumnus of the University of Pittsburgh, where he had been captain of the golf team.

The field of 159 included six entrants from Japan and one from South Africa; the rest from 31 states and the District of Columbia. For the first time, a Japanese player made the cut at the Open. Kanekichi Nakamura was part of a tour of the U.S. by Japanese golfers and finished in 58th at 325. Chris Brinke captured low-amateur honors in 32nd place at 315, a stroke ahead of 1933 champion Johnny Goodman.

Oakmont had previously hosted the U.S. Open in 1927, the PGA Championship in 1922, and the U.S. Amateur in 1919 and 1925.

The Stimpmeter was inspired by the fast greens of this Open. Edward Stimpson Sr., the Massachusetts amateur champion and a former captain of the Harvard golf team, devised a simple device and method to accurately measure the speed of greens.

Course layout

Source:

Lengths of the course for previous major championships:

Past champions in the field

Made the cut 

Source:

Missed the cut 

Source:

Round summaries

First round
Thursday, June 6, 1935

Source:

Second round
Friday, June 7, 1935

Source:

Third round
Saturday, June 8, 1935 (morning)

Source:

Final round
Saturday, June 8, 1935 (afternoon)

Source:

Scorecard

Cumulative tournament scores, relative to par
{|class="wikitable" span = 50 style="font-size:85%;
|-
|style="background: Pink;" width=10|
|Birdie
|style="background: PaleGreen;" width=10|
|Bogey
|style="background: Green;" width=10|
|Double bogey
|}
Source:

References

External links
USGA Championship Database
USOpen.com - 1935

U.S. Open (golf)
Golf in Pennsylvania
U.S. Open
U.S. Open
U.S. Open golf
June 1935 sports events